The Ship Mountains are a mountain range in San Bernardino County, California.

References 

Mountain ranges of Southern California
Mountain ranges of San Bernardino County, California
Mountain ranges of the Sonoran Desert
Mountain ranges of the Mojave Desert